Semi-flexible rod polymers are a kind of organic polymer which may be converted to conductive polymers by appropriate oxidations or doping.  

Examples include polyaniline, poly(p-phenylene oxide) and poly(p-phenylene sulfide).

External links
 Structural Studies of Conducting Polymers by M.J. Winokur (University of Wisconsin) - Semi-flexible rods

Organic polymers